Tegula snodgrassi is a species of sea snail, a marine gastropod mollusk in the family Tegulidae.

Distribution
This marine species was found in the Pacific Ocean off the Albemarle Island, Galapagos Islands.

References

External links
 To USNM Invertebrate Zoology Mollusca Collection
 To World Register of Marine Species
 

snodgrassi
Gastropods described in 1902